The Forest City Film Festival (often abbreviated as FCFF) is a film festival located in London, Ontario. Founded in 2016, the Forest City Film Festival centres on exhibiting the work of filmmakers from Southwestern Ontario in juried competition for features, shorts, documentaries, short animations and other categories, although it also screens a selection of other Canadian and international films out of competition.

The event is typically held in October each year, principally at the London Public Library's Wolf Performance Hall.

History 
The Forest City Film Festival was founded in 2016 by Dorothy Downs. The first festival was a collection of twenty-five films, screened over three days in November of 2016 to an audience of 1200.

In 2017, the festival grew, adding an animation category and an out-of-competition International Screening, totaling 48 films. The festival’s duration was expanded from three days to five in October, with 1800 audience members in attendance. 

In 2018, FCFF added a special Flashback Friday screening, a celebration of older films with a connection to the region. The Breakfast Club was screened, followed by a Q&A with special guest and London-native John Kapelos, who played Carl, the janitor in the film. The festival also held their first pitch competition for short films. FCFF 2018 offered 48 films once again, met by a 33% increase in attendees, totaling 2400 audience members in attendance that year.

In 2019, the Forest City Youth Film Festival was introduced, offering a separate competition for high school student filmmakers in Southwestern Ontario. This year, the number of films increased to 64 films which were screened over a five day period. Attendance increased from 2400 to 3200.

In 2020, the COVID-19 pandemic forced the Forest City Film Festival to offer their festival digitally. For an eight day period, 75 films were available for online on-demand viewing from anywhere in Canada, resulting in 4000 audience members in attendance. Additionally, a new Music Video category was added to the competition.

In 2021, the film festival took on a hybrid model, returning to in-person screenings in downtown London while also continuing to offer nation-wide online viewing. FCFF 2021 offered 92 films, viewed by 6100 in-person attendees and 4500 virtual views.

2021 also saw the festival’s Industry Sessions take on the name Ontario Screen Creators Conference, alongside expanding their offerings to a full weekend of events dedicated to education and networking for film industry professionals. Additionally, the pitch competition was rebranded to be Project Pitch, a national competition to pitch a feature film for the opportunity to win a prize package with a value $60,000 in products, services, and cash grants. The Forest City Youth Film Festival also grew dramatically, screening 29 short films across seven categories.

Film Categories 
The Forest City Film Festival offers the following categories of competition for submitted films:

 Narrative Feature, a feature-length film that tells a fictional or fictionalized story, event or narrative. 
 Short Narrative, a film under 25 minutes that tells a fictional or fictionalized story, event or narrative.
 Feature Documentary, a feature-length non-fictional film.
 Short Documentary, a non-fictional film under 40 minutes.
 Short Animation, an animated film under 25 minutes.
 Music Video, a film of any length integrating a song or musical album.
 Screenplay, a screenplay between 75 and 120 pages.

In 2021, an Experimental category was also available.

Southwestern Ontario Connection 
In order to be eligible for the Forest City Film Festival competition, there must be a substantial connection to Southwestern Ontario. This connection may be:

 At least one member of the key artistic team must be from or resided in Southwestern Ontario for a portion of their life.
 The film is about a person, location, or event in Southwestern Ontario.
 The film was produced, in part or in full, in Southwestern Ontario.

Awards 
The Forest City Film Festival designates one film from each competition category as the best of the year. The film is selected by a viewing committee made up of filmmakers and community members. Each award winner receives a trophy and a cash prize.
The exception to this is the Old Oak Audience Choice Award. This award is not selected by a committee, instead selected by audience rankings.

Special Screenings and Events 
Each year since 2017, the Forest City Film Festival has offered special screenings and events within the duration of the festival.

Lerners Opening Night 
Lerners Opening Night is the official launch of the festival, though it is not always the first day of screenings. The film is typically out of competition. Traditionally, the screening is preceded by a gala event at a local restaurant.

Previous Lerners Opening Night films include:

 Trigger Point (screened at FCFF 2021)

Flashback Friday 
Flashback Friday, traditionally held on a Friday evening during the festival, presents a screening of an older film with a connection to the region of Southwestern Ontario. A member of the cast or crew typically attends for a post-screen question and answer session.

Previous Flashback Friday films include:

 The Breakfast Club (screened at FCFF 2018)

Music Video Night 
Music Video Night is an event screening all of the selected films in the Music Video category. Additional to the screening, there are live performances by featured musical artists.

Indigenous Film Programs 
The Forest City Film Festival works with Indigenous filmmakers within the region to curate programs of Indigenous films.

Previous Indigenous films screened include:

 Beans (screened at FCFF 2021)

These curated films are not a part of the film festival competition, though films by Indigenous filmmakers that are submitted and selected are in contention.

School-friendly Screenings 
Each year, the Forest City Film Festival invites classes from across Southwestern Ontario to attend weekday matinee screenings. A Teacher's Guide is developed and distributed to ensure the screened films are age-appropriate.

Forest City Youth Film Festival 
The Forest City Youth Film Festival (often abbreviated as FCYFF) is a separate filmmaking competition under the umbrella of the Forest City Film Festival. Entrants to the FCYFF must be high school students in Southwestern Ontario. The competition is judged by a jury of industry professionals. Selected films are screened at a special event during the Forest City Film Festival.

Historically, the categories of competition are:

 Animation
 Narrative
 Documentary
 Pitch
 Experimental
 Music Video
 Promotional Video

Live online seminars are offered year-round to member school boards. These seminars give high schoolers and aspiring filmmakers the opportunity to learn more about the various aspects of filmmaking from industry experts, student filmmakers, and post-secondary educators, with an additional focus on career opportunities.

Ontario Screen Creators Conference 
Previously known as FCFF Industry Sessions, the Ontario Screen Creators Conference (often abbreviated as OSCC) is a three-day conference that takes place on one weekend of the Forest City Film Festival. The conference invites filmmakers and industry professionals of all experience levels to learn and connect at seminars, panels, networking parties, and other events held both in London, Ontario and online. Previous sessions have included:

 Behind the Scenes with Colm Feore, a longform interview with Canadian stage and screen actor Colm Feore.
 Documentary Design, a panel of documentarians discussing the process of defining visual design in documentary films.
 Authentic Voices Through a Diverse Lens, a panel of LGBTQIA+ and BIPOC filmmakers discussing representation in film.
 Forest City Feature Film Pitch, an annual pitch competition for emerging filmmakers to present unproduced screenplays; the winner of the competition receives $60,000 in grants and in-kind services from various organizations and companies. The festival previously offered a smaller-scale pitch competition for local emerging filmmakers working on their first short films; it was expanded to feature films in 2021, and was open to filmmakers from anywhere in Canada as long as they agreed to shoot and produce at least 50 per cent of their film in and around London. The winner of the first feature pitch competition was Geordie Sabbagh for his film Audit; the 2022 competition was won by Faran Moradi for Cry Wolf.

References

External links

Film festivals in Ontario
Festivals in London, Ontario
Film festivals established in 2016
2016 establishments in Ontario